The 2021–22 Marquette Golden Eagles women's basketball team represented Marquette University in the 2021–22 NCAA Division I women's basketball season. The Golden Eagles, led by third year head coach Megan Duffy, played their home games at the Al McGuire Center and were members of the Big East Conference.

Roster

Schedule

|-
!colspan=9 style=| Regular season

|-
!colspan=9 style=|Big East Tournament

|-
!colspan=9 style=|WNIT

Rankings

See also
2021–22 Marquette Golden Eagles men's basketball team

References

Marquette Golden Eagles women's basketball seasons
Marquette
Marquette
Marquette
Marquette